Haliburton Highlands Secondary School (HHSS) is a small secondary school situated in Haliburton, Ontario, Canada, and is located on Head Lake.

The school provides grades 9-12 education for all of Haliburton County and its surrounding area.

Activities
Haliburton Highlands Secondary School has strong drama and music programs. The school's drama students have participated in the filming of the Camp Rock films. The art program at the school includes the opportunity for students to earn a college credit alongside their high school diploma at the Haliburton School of the Arts. There is also a robotics team that has been operating since 2015.

Sports
HHSS has many sports teams, including hockey, wrestling, volleyball, basketball, soccer, badminton, football, field hockey, snowboarding, curling, and rugby.

Notable alumni
Mike Bradley, Edmonton Eskimos (CFL) running back 
Matt Duchene, Ottawa Senators, (NHL) forward, Winter Olympic gold medal athlete
Cody Hodgson, Buffalo Sabres (NHL) forward

See also
List of high schools in Ontario

References

External links
Haliburton Highlands Secondary School

High schools in Ontario
Educational institutions in Canada with year of establishment missing